Bach's first cantata cycle refers to the church cantatas Johann Sebastian Bach composed for the somewhat less than 60 occasions of the liturgical year of his first year as  in Leipzig which required concerted music. That year ran from the first Sunday after Trinity in 1723 to Trinity Sunday of the next year:
 Trinity I, : Die Elenden sollen essen, BWV 75
 Trinity II, : Die Himmel erzählen die Ehre Gottes, BWV 76
 Trinity III, : Weimar cantata Ich hatte viel Bekümmernis, BWV 21 restaged (third version in C minor)
 Trinity IV, : Ein ungefärbt Gemüte, BWV 24, and Weimar cantata Barmherziges Herze der ewigen Liebe, BWV 185 restaged
 Nativity of St. John the Baptist, : Ihr Menschen, rühmet Gottes Liebe, BWV 167
 Trinity V, : no extant cantata
 Visitation, :  Herz und Mund und Tat und Leben, BWV 147 (adaptation of BWV 147a, a Weimar cantata for Advent IV) and possibly Magnificat in E-flat major, BWV 243a (early version without Christmas interpolations)
 Trinity VI, : no extant cantata
 Trinity VII, : Ärgre dich, o Seele, nicht, BWV 186 (adapted from BWV 186a, a Weimar cantata for Advent III)
 Trinity VIII, : Erforsche mich, Gott, und erfahre mein Herz, BWV 136
 Trinity IX, : Herr, gehe nicht ins Gericht mit deinem Knecht, BWV 105
 Trinity X, : Schauet doch und sehet, ob irgend ein Schmerz sei, BWV 46
 Trinity XI, : Siehe zu, daß deine Gottesfurcht nicht Heuchelei sei, BWV 179 and Weimar cantata Mein Herze schwimmt im Blut, BWV 199 restaged (Leipzig version in D minor)
 Trinity XII, : Lobe den Herrn, meine Seele, BWV 69a
 Trinity XIII, : Du sollt Gott, deinen Herren, lieben, BWV 77
 Trinity XIV, : Es ist nichts Gesundes an meinem Leibe, BWV 25
 (Ratswechsel: not part of the liturgical year, see below)
 Trinity XV, : Warum betrübst du dich, mein Herz, BWV 138
 Trinity XVI, : Christus, der ist mein Leben, BWV 95
 Trinity XVII, : Bringet dem Herrn Ehre seines Namens, BWV 148
 Trinity XVIII, : no extant cantata
 St. Michael's Day, : no extant cantata
 Trinity XIX, : Ich elender Mensch, wer wird mich erlösen, BWV BWV 48
 Trinity XX, : Weimar cantata Ach! ich sehe, itzt, da ich zur Hochzeit gehe, BWV 162 restaged
 Trinity XXI, : Ich glaube, lieber Herr, hilf meinem Unglauben, BWV 109
 Trinity XXII, : Was soll ich aus dir machen, Ephraim, BWV 89
 Reformation Day,  (coinciding with Trinity XXIII): possibly Weimar cantata Nur jedem das Seine, BWV 163 restaged; Alternatively an early version of BWV 80/80b?
 Trinity XXIV, : O Ewigkeit, du Donnerwort, BWV 60
 Trinity XXV, : Es reißet euch ein schrecklich Ende, BWV 90
 Trinity XXVI, : Wachet! betet! betet! wachet! BWV 70 (adapted from a Weimar Advent II cantata)
 Advent I, : Weimar cantata Nun komm, der Heiden Heiland, BWV 61 restaged
 Christmas, : Weimar cantata Christen, ätzet diesen Tag, BWV 63 restaged; Also Magnificat, BWV 243a (including Christmas interpolations) and Sanctus in D major, BWV 238
 Second Day of Christmas, : Darzu ist erschienen der Sohn Gottes, BWV 40
 Third Day of Christmas, : Sehet, welch eine Liebe hat uns der Vater erzeiget, BWV 64
 New Year, : Singet dem Herrn ein neues Lied, BWV 190 (instrumental parts lost)
 Sunday after New Year, : Schau, lieber Gott, wie meine Feind, BWV 153
 Epiphany, : Sie werden aus Saba alle kommen, BWV 65
 Epiphany I, : Mein liebster Jesus ist verloren, BWV 154
 Epiphany II, : Weimar cantata Mein Gott, wie lang, ach lange? BWV 155 restaged
 Epiphany III, : Herr, wie du willt, so schicks mit mir, BWV 73
 Epiphany IV, : Jesus schläft, was soll ich hoffen? BWV 81
 Purification, : Erfreute Zeit im neuen Bunde, BWV 83
 Septuagesima, : Nimm, was dein ist, und gehe hin, BWV 144
 Sexagesima, : Leichtgesinnte Flattergeister, BWV 181 and Weimar cantata Gleichwie der Regen und Schnee vom Himmel fällt, BWV 18 restaged in its Leipzig version (A minor)
 Annunciation and Palm Sunday : Siehe eine Jungfrau ist schwanger, BWV 1135 (previously BWV Anh. 199; music lost) and Weimar cantata Himmelskönig, sei willkommen, BWV 182 restaged.
 (Good Friday, : St John Passion, BWV 245, 1st version — Passion, not considered as a cantata part of the cycle)
 Easter, : early cantata Christ lag in Todes Banden, BWV 4 restaged (Leipzig version); Weimar cantata Der Himmel lacht! Die Erde jubilieret, BWV 31 restaged (Leipzig version)
 Easter Monday, : Erfreut euch, ihr Herzen, BWV 66
 Easter Tuesday, : Ein Herz, das seinen Jesum lebend weiß, BWV 134
 Quasimodogeniti, : Halt im Gedächtnis Jesum Christ, BWV 67
 Misericordias Domini, : Du Hirte Israel, höre, BWV 104
 Jubilate, : Weimar cantate Weinen, Klagen, Sorgen, Zagen, BWV 12 restaged in a version with a slightly modified instrumentation
 Cantate, : Wo gehest du hin? BWV 166
 Rogate, : Wahrlich, wahrlich, ich sage euch, BWV BWV 86
 Ascension, : Wer da gläubet und getauft wird, BWV 37
 Exaudi, : Sie werden euch in den Bann tun, BWV 44
 Pentecost, : Wer mich liebet, der wird mein Wort halten, BWV 59 and Weimar cantata Erschallet, ihr Lieder, erklinget, ihr Saiten! BWV 172 restaged in its first Leipzig version (D major)
 Pentecost Monday, : no extant cantata
 Pentecost Tuesday, : Erwünschtes Freudenlicht, BWV 184
 Trinity, : Höchsterwünschtes Freudenfest, BWV 194, originally a consecration cantata, restaged in its first Leipzig version

Not a part of the liturgical year:
 New council (Ratswechsel), : Preise, Jerusalem, den Herrn, BWV 119

References

Further reading
 

First cantata cycle, Bach's
1720s in music